Clinton DeWitt Boyd (September 26, 1884 – September 1950) was a Middletown, Ohio attorney, Common Pleas judge and politician and was one of four founders of Phi Kappa Tau fraternity as an undergraduate at Miami University.

Boyd was born and raised in Mount Orab, Ohio. He came to Oxford, Ohio in September 1903 as a third-year preparatory student in the Miami Academy. He began his college work in 1904.
At Miami, Boyd was both an athlete and one of the most silver-tongued of Miami's orators. He was a distance runner, representing the varsity track team in the mile and 880-yard events. He captained the team in his senior year and acquired the nickname "Teeny" because of his slight runner's build, and he was active on the intramural track and basketball teams.

Boyd was a four-year member of the Miami Union Literary Society and was elected vice-president. His speech, "Emancipation of a Backward Race," won him the gold medal in the university's oratorical contest in 1907.

After Miami, Boyd enrolled in the University of Cincinnati's law school, and then transferred to the University of Michigan, where he earned his law degree in 1910. He opened a law office in Middletown, Ohio.

Boyd was a persistent politician and a successful county judge who ran several times for statewide office in Ohio without success. He was defeated in the Republican primary of 1924 for Lieutenant Governor of Ohio and was defeated in the 1926, 1928 and 1944 Republican primaries for Ohio Attorney General. He was appointed to the common pleas bench of Butler County, Ohio in 1929 and was twice reelected to that position, retiring in 1937. He was defeated in the Republican primary for Chief Justice of the Ohio Supreme Court in 1938 and 1950 and was defeated in the general elections for judge of the Ohio Supreme Court in 1940 and 1946 and in the Republican primary in 1948.

Boyd remained actively interested in the Phi Kappa Tau throughout his life. He was the first person elected to the position of national organizer at the fraternity's Danville, Kentucky, convention of 1915; and worked aggressively to extend the fraternity to Northwestern, Wabash, Purdue, Wisconsin, Nevada, and Carnegie Tech. He was a frequent speaker at Founders' Day gatherings at Miami and around the country. In the final year of his life, he visited several chapters and alumni on the West Coast.

Boyd helped to initiate his son, Clinton Dewitt, Jr., into Phi Kappa Tau at Miami University in 1948; and Boyd's grandson, Mark, is also a member.

Boyd was killed in an automobile accident in September 1950 when the car he was driving skidded on a slick road en route to the Ohio Republican Convention. He was interred at Woodside Cemetery, Middletown, Ohio.

References

 Anson, Jack L., The Golden Jubilee History of Phi Kappa Tau, Lawhead Press, Athens Ohio: 1957
 Ball, Charles T., From Old Main to a New Century: A History of Phi Kappa Tau, Heritage Publishers, Phoenix: 1996

External links

1884 births
1950 deaths
Miami University alumni
People from Middletown, Ohio
Ohio state court judges
Phi Kappa Tau founders
Road incident deaths in Ohio
Ohio Republicans
University of Michigan Law School alumni
20th-century American judges